Kafur may refer to:

 Kafur, Nigeria, a Local Government Area in Katsina State
 Abu al-Misk Kafur (905–968), vizier of Egypt, becoming its de facto ruler (from 946)
 Malik Kafur (died 1316), a prominent general of the Delhi Sultanate